Marcos Antonio Cáceres (born 5 May 1986 in Asunción) is a Paraguayan football defender currently playing for Club Guaraní. He has previously played for Cerro Porteño, and in Argentina with Racing and Newell's Old Boys. As an international footballer, Cáceres was included in the squads for the 2011 and 2015 editions of the Copa América.

Cáceres started his playing career in 2006 with Cerro Porteño where he played a total of 24 games in all competitions before joining Racing Club in 2007. After 2 substitute appearances Cáceres quickly established himself as a regular starter in the Racing Club lineup.

International career
Cáceres made his international debut on 22 August 2007 against Venezuela. Cáceres made one appearance in the qualification cycle for the 2010 World Cup, and was not named to the squad for the team that reached the quarter-final. Cáceres did make the squad for the 2011 Copa América, and made one appearance, featuring at right back in the semi-final penalty shootout victory over Venezuela, replacing the suspended Antolín Alcaraz. Paraguay would lose in the final to Uruguay, and Cáceres lost his place in the side to Elvis Marecos.

Cáceres made two appearances in the qualification cycle for the 2014 World Cup, as Paraguay failed to qualify. He made the squad for the 2015 Copa América, featuring in three games at right back, including their opening game, and the third-place playoff defeat to Peru; the other matches were started by Bruno Valdez.

Out of the national team picture for the next six years, Cáceres made a shocking return during Paraguay's World Cup qualifying matches in September of 2021. He wasn't included in the original squad, but after Alberto Espínola left their first match against Ecuador with an injury inside 10 minutes, Cáceres took his place in the squad for the next two matches. Robert Rojas replaced Espínola against Ecuador, and started against Colombia and Venezuela, but left the match against Venezuela with  an injury. Cáceres was brought on for the final 10 minutes of the 2–1 victory, and he made his first appearance for the national team in six years and two months.

Honours
Newell's Old Boys
Primera División: 2013 Final

References

External links
 
 Football-Lineups player profile
 Argentine Primera statistics
 United Press article

1986 births
Living people
Sportspeople from Asunción
Paraguayan footballers
Paraguay international footballers
Association football defenders
Cerro Porteño players
Racing Club de Avellaneda footballers
Newell's Old Boys footballers
Argentine Primera División players
Paraguayan expatriate footballers
Expatriate footballers in Argentina
Paraguayan expatriate sportspeople in Argentina
2011 Copa América players
2015 Copa América players
20th-century Paraguayan people
21st-century Paraguayan people